Rameez Nemat (born 14 November 1986) is an Indian first-class cricketer who plays for Jharkhand.

References

External links
 

1986 births
Living people
Indian cricketers
Jharkhand cricketers
Place of birth missing (living people)